This is a list of the presidents of Montenegro, including the heads of state of the Socialist Republic of Montenegro, a constituent country of the Socialist Federal Republic of Yugoslavia and heads of state of the Republic of Montenegro (1992–2006), a constituent country of the Federal Republic of Yugoslavia / State Union of Serbia and Montenegro. Prior to 1974, Montenegro's head of state was the speaker of the Montenegrin parliament.

The President (Predsjednik) is directly elected to a five-year term and is limited by the Constitution to a maximum of two terms. In addition to being the Commander-in-chief of the Armed Forces, the President has the procedural duty of appointing the Prime Minister with the consent of the Parliament, and has some influence on foreign policy. The President's office is located in the Blue Palace, in the former royal capital Cetinje.

Montenegro within Yugoslavia / Serbia and Montenegro (1943–2006)

People's Republic of Montenegro / Socialist Republic of Montenegro

{| class="wikitable" style="text-align:center"
|-
! rowspan=2| 
! rowspan=2| Portrait
! width=30% rowspan=2| Name
! colspan=3| Term of office
! rowspan=2| Political Party
|-
! Took office
! Left office
! Time in office
|- align="center" 
| colspan=7| President of the Montenegrin Anti-Fascist Assembly of National Liberation

|-align="center" 
| colspan=7| Presidents of the Presidium of the People's Assembly

|- align="center" 
| colspan=7| Presidents of the People's Assembly

|- align="center" 
| colspan=7| Presidents of the Presidency

|- align="center" 
| colspan=7| President of Republic

Republic of Montenegro

{| class="wikitable" style="text-align:center"
|-
! rowspan=2| 
! rowspan=2| Portrait
! width=30% rowspan=2| Name
! colspan=3| Term of office
! rowspan=2| Political Party
! rowspan=2| Elected
|-
! Took office
! Left office
! Time in office

Montenegro (2006–present)
Montenegro became independent on 3 June 2006.

{| class="wikitable" style="text-align:center"
|-
! rowspan=2| 
! rowspan=2| Portrait
! width=30% rowspan=2| Name
! colspan=3| Term of office
! rowspan=2| Political Party
! rowspan=2| Elected
|-
! Took office
! Left office
! Time in office

See also
List of rulers of Montenegro
List of heads of state of Montenegro, for a comprehensive list of Montenegrin heads of state since 1696
President of Montenegro
President of the Parliament of Montenegro
Prime Minister of Montenegro
President of Serbia and Montenegro
List of heads of state of Yugoslavia

Notes

External links
Official Web Site of The President of Montenegro

Montenegro
Politics of Montenegro
Presidents